Stephanie Meadow (born 20 January 1992) is a Northern Irish professional golfer who played for the University of Alabama and made her professional debut at the 2014 U.S. Women's Open at Pinehurst.

Amateur career
Meadow won The Womens Amateur Championship in 2012. She appeared for the British and Irish team at the 2012 and 2014 Curtis Cup.

At the University of Alabama, Meadow became the Crimson Tide's first four-time first-team All-American. She left Alabama as the career record holder in most every category. She finished with a 71.89 scoring average, just 0.17 strokes above par per round over her 132 career rounds. Meadow won nine career tournaments - three times more than anyone else in school history - while carding school records with 73 career rounds of par or better, 125 counting rounds (95.5 percent) and 404 birdies.

Meadow was part of the Tide's first NCAA Women's Golf Championship in 2012 and is the only Southeast Conference women's golfer to achieve both first team All-American and first team Academic All-American honors in consecutive years.

Professional career

Meadow turned professional in 2014 just after qualifying for the 2014 U.S. Women's Open and went on to secure 3rd place. This remains her best result at a major championship. In 2014, she achieved her highest ever position in the Women's World Golf Rankings with number eighty-two.

Meadow represented Ireland at the 2016 Summer Olympics.

Meadow gained an LPGA Tour card for 2017 via the LPGA Final Qualifying Tournament.

Meadow won her first Symetra Tour tournament at the 2018 IOA Championship in a playoff. She finished sixth on the Symetra Tour money list, thus earning her LPGA Tour Card for 2019. In August 2019, she won the World Invitational at Galgorm Castle, Northern Ireland.

At the 2020 Summer Olympics, held in August 2021, she finished 7th.

Professional wins (2)

Symetra Tour wins (1)

Symetra Tour playoff record (1–1)

Other wins (1)
2019 ISPS Handa World Invitational (Women's event)

Results in LPGA majors
Results not in chronological order before 2019

^ The Evian Championship was added as a major in 2013

CUT = missed the half-way cut
NT = no tournament
T = tied

Summary

Most consecutive cuts made – 2 (three times)
Longest streak of top-10s – 1 (twice)

Team appearances
Amateur
European Ladies' Team Championship (representing Ireland ): 2011, 2013
Vagliano Trophy (representing Great Britain & Ireland): 2011, 2013
Curtis Cup (representing Great Britain & Ireland): 2012 (winners), 2014
Espirito Santo Trophy (representing Ireland): 2012

References

External links

Player profile – Stephanie Meadow – 2014 U.S. Women's Open (Archived)
Stephanie Meadow – Alabama Crimson Tide

Female golfers from Northern Ireland
Alabama Crimson Tide women's golfers
LPGA Tour golfers
Winners of ladies' major amateur golf championships
Olympic golfers of Ireland
Golfers at the 2016 Summer Olympics
Golfers at the 2020 Summer Olympics
Sportspeople from County Antrim
1992 births
Living people